Aivaras Bendžius (born January 26, 1993) is a Lithuanian ice hockey player.

Bendzius made his SM-liiga debut playing with Ilves during the 2012–13 SM-liiga season.

Career statistics

Regular season and playoffs

International
Junior – U18

Junior – U20

Senior

References

External links
 

1993 births
Living people
Ilves players
Lithuanian ice hockey forwards
People from Elektrėnai
HDD Jesenice players
Lithuanian expatriate ice hockey people
Lithuanian expatriate sportspeople in Slovenia
Lithuanian expatriate sportspeople in Finland
Lithuanian expatriate sportspeople in Belgium
Lithuanian expatriate sportspeople in France
Lithuanian expatriate sportspeople in the Netherlands
Expatriate ice hockey players in Slovenia
Expatriate ice hockey players in Finland
Expatriate ice hockey players in Belgium
Expatriate ice hockey players in France
Expatriate ice hockey players in the Netherlands
Nijmegen Devils players